David Mims (born May 18, 1988) is a former American football offensive tackle. He was signed by the Chiefs as an undrafted free agent in 2011. In college at Virginia Union in Richmond, Virginia, he was named to the CIAA All-Freshmen team, a 3x first-team All-CIAA, and a 2x All-American. Mims graduated from South Mecklenburg High School in Charlotte, North Carolina.

Professional career

Pre-draft

A prospect for the 2011 NFL Draft, Mims was projected to be drafted in the fifth round.

Kansas City Chiefs
Mims was signed by the Kansas City Chiefs as an undrafted free agent following the 2011 NFL Draft on July 26, 2011. Mims was waived on September 3 during final roster cuts. After clearing waivers, he was signed to the Chiefs' practice squad on September 4. He was promoted to the active roster on November 29.

Baltimore Ravens
On February 6, 2013, Mims was signed to a reserve/future contract by the Baltimore Ravens. On August 25, 2013, he was waived by the Ravens.

Further reading

References

External links

Kansas City Chiefs bio

1988 births
Living people
American football offensive tackles
Canadian football offensive linemen
American players of Canadian football
Virginia Union Panthers football players
Kansas City Chiefs players
Boston Brawlers players
Baltimore Ravens players
Winnipeg Blue Bombers players